Ieper railway station is located in Ypres in West Flanders, Belgium.  The station was opened in 1854 during the reign of Leopold I of Belgium. It is located on the line from Kortrijk to Poperinge run by NMBS, Belgian railway line 69.

Train services
The station is served by the following services:

Intercity services (IC-04) Poperinge - Kortrijk - Ghent - Sint-Niklaas - Antwerp

In Flanders Fields
The station is near the Menin Gate and other places associated with the First World War with British and Commonwealth war graves located alongside the line from the Kortrijk direction, known as Railway Dugouts Burial Ground (Transport Farm) Commonwealth War Graves Commission Cemetery.

Railway stations in Belgium
Railway stations opened in 1854
Railway stations in West Flanders
1854 establishments in Belgium